Bancorp is a word used in the names of bank holding companies which are not themselves licensed banks. 

Instances of this usage, and other unrelated uses of Bancorp are:

Companies
 1st Constitution Bancorp
 The Bancorp, Inc.
 Carver Bancorp
 Clifton Bancorp, Inc.
 Eagle Bancorp
 East West Bancorp
 First BanCorp
 First Bancorp
 First Midwest Bancorp
 Hudson City Bancorp
 U.S. Bancorp

Former companies
 Citizens Republic Bancorp
 Commerce Bancorp
 First Interstate Bancorp
 First Maryland Bancorp
 Greater Community Bancorp
 Pacific Capital Bancorp
 Rainier Bancorp
 Summit Bancorp
 Superior Bancorp
 West Coast Bancorp

Geographical locations
 US Bancorp Center
 U.S. Bancorp Tower

Other
 Szendrey-Ramos v. First Bancorp